Patricia Castell, born Ovidia Amanda Paramidani Padín (25 April 1926 – 29 September 2013), was an Argentine actress, appearing on radio, television and in films. Born in Avellaneda in 1926, her career began in the 1940s and lasted for more than fifty years.

In 1949 she starred in the boxing drama Diez segundos, the first of many appearances alongside María Rosa Gallo over several decades, including Perla Negra and Zíngara (1996). She starred in many soap operas/telenovelas, and was perhaps best known for her portrayal of the evil Cecilia in the soap opera Celeste.

Death
Castell, aged 87, died in Buenos Aires, Argentina on 29 September 2013.

Filmography 

1944: Hay que casar a Paulina
1948: La serpiente de cascabel
1948: The Street Calls
1949: Diez segundos
1950: El Zorro pierde el pelo
1950: La culpa la tuvo el otro
1955: Sinfonía de juventud
1958: Las apariencias engañan
1970: Su comedia favorita (TV Series, 1 episode)
1970: Perdón para una mujer (TV Series, 9 episodes)
1971: Teleteatro Palmolive del aire (TV Series, 1 episode)
1971: Teleteatro Palmolive del aire (TV Series, 1 episode)
1971: La comedia del domingo (TV Series, 1 episode)
1971: Estación retiro (TV Series, 208 episodes)
1972: Me llaman Gorrión (TV Series, 39 episodes)
1970-1972: Alta comedia (TV Series, 2 episodes)
1972: Mi amigo Luis
1973: Mi dulce enamorada (TV Series, 28 episodes)
1972-1973: Malevo (TV Series, 272 episodes)
1973: El teatro de Myriam de Urquijo (TV Series, 3 episodes)
1974: La madre María
1975: No hace falta quererte (TV Series, 19 episodes)
1976: El gato (TV Series, 19 episodes)
1977: El cuarteador (TV Series 1977, 19 episodes)
1979: Novia de vacaciones (TV Series, 29 episodes)
1979: Andrea Celeste (TV Series, 1 episode)
1980: Llena de amor (TV Series, 19 episodes)
1980: Hola Pelusa (TV Series, 19 episodes)
1981: Los especiales de ATC (TV Series, 1 episode)
1981: Herencia de amor (TV Series, 19 episodes)
1981: Eugenia (TV Series, 19 episodes)
1981: Comedias para vivir (TV Series, 1 episode)
1982: Teatro de humor (TV Series, 3 episodes)
1982: Los exclusivos del Nueve (TV Series 1982, 1 episode)
1982: El oriental (TV Series, 19 episodes)
1983: Señorita maestra (TV Series, 199 episodes)
1984: Séptimo grado... adiós a la escuela (TV Series)
1985: Libertad condicionada (TV Series, 284 episodes)
1985: El pulpo negro (TV Mini Series, 13 episodes)
1988: Vendedoras de Lafayette (TV Series, 29 episodes)
1990: Vendedoras de Lafayette (TV Series, 3 episodes)
1990: Stress (TV Series, 28 episodes)
1991: Chiquilina mía (TV Series, 195 episodes)
1991: Celeste (TV Series, 172 episodes)
1991: Antonella (TV Series, 39 episodes)
1993: Casi todo, casi nada (TV Series, 29 episodes)
1994: Black Pearl (TV Series, 200 episodes) 
1996: Gypsy (TV Series, 1 episode)
1999: Champions of Life (TV Series, 9 episodes)
1999-2000: Vulnerables (TV Series, 57 episodes)
2001: Yago, Pure Passion (TV Series, 32 episodes)
2002: Runaway Lady (TV Series, 2 episodes)
2002-2004: Sweethearts (TV Series, 32 episodes)
2004: Los secretos de papá (TV Series, 1 episode)
2006: Sos mi vida (TV Series, 38 episodes)
2009: Valientes (TV Series, 1 episode)
2012: El Tabarís, lleno de estrellas (TV Movie)

References

1926 births
2013 deaths
Actresses from Buenos Aires
Argentine television actresses
Argentine film actresses
People from Buenos Aires Province